The 1860 Pennsylvania gubernatorial was held on October 9, almost one month before Presidential election. Andrew Curtin of the newly formed Republican Party won the governor's mansion over Democrat Henry Donnel Foster.

Candidates

Democratic
Henry Donnel Foster, former U.S. Congressman (from Westmoreland County)

Republican
Andrew Curtin, former Secretary of the Commonwealth (from Centre County)

Campaign
As in most of the country, the growing tension over the expansion of slavery was the dominant electoral issue. Although outgoing Governor William F. Packer had been lauded for expanding public education and for aiding the state's iron and glass industries through tough economic times, his reputation was tainted by a strong connection to President James Buchanan. Nonetheless, the state Democratic Party remained strong, and, despite the national split, leadership united behind Foster. By contrast, the Republicans, which had participated in only one prior gubernatorial election, was marked by division. Although Abraham Lincoln was emerging as the party's presidential candidate, state party bosses had hoped to nominate Simon Cameron; it took some time for the party establishment to unify around Curtin, a Lincoln supporter, and his campaign got off to somewhat of a slow start.

Although both candidates discussed similar issues in their campaign, particularly public education and industrial development, local issues were totally overshadowed by the impending threat of war. While Democrats, who backed the Stephen A. Douglas and the Northern plank of their national party almost unanimously, rallied hard behind Foster, the problems with the party's national machinery caught up with their candidate. Curtin, a powerful speaker, was able to convince voters that choosing the Republican line was the only way to keep the nation from division, a message that allowed him to achieve a narrow victory.

Results

Notes

References
 

1860
Pennsylvania
Gubernatorial
October 1860 events